Bitung is a city on the northern coast of the island of Sulawesi in Indonesia. It is in the province of North Sulawesi, and faces Lembeh Island (which forms two districts of the city) and the Lembeh Strait, which is known for its colourful marine life, in particular sea slugs. Bitung has a population of 187,932 at the 2010 Census, making it the second most populated city in the province after the capital Manado, rising to 225,134 at the 2020 Census.

At present large numbers of development projects undergoing centering around the city, which include the SEZ, Manado–Bitung Toll Road, Bitung International Ocean Going Ship Port, and the Makasar-Bitung rail track, which will automatically make the city a gateway to the Pacific region.

Administrative divisions 
The city is divided into eight districts (kecamatan), tabulated below with their areas and their populations at the 2010 Census and the 2020 Census. The table also includes the number of administrative villages (urban kelurahan) in each district.

Notes: (a) formerly Bitung Tengah (Central Bitung). (b) formerly Bitung Barat (West Bitung). (c) formerly Bitung Selatan (South Bitung); the district includes 15 offshore islands. (d) formerly Bitung Timur (East Bitung). (e) formerly Bitung Utara (North Bitung); the district includes offshore island of Pulau Powteng.

Nature Reserve
Tangkoko Batuangus Nature Reserve is two hours' drive away from Manado, and one hour from Bitung. Tarsius spectrum can be found easily in the Nature Reserve.

Economy

Bitung Special Economic Zone (SEZ)
Bitung was named as one of the country's Special Economic Zones in 2014. Priority sectors in the area are logistics, herbal pharmacy, fish processing and coconut processing. Based on Government Regulation No.32/2014 on Bitung SEZ, it will occupy an area of 534 hectares.
The SEZ is divided into three zones, namely industrial zone, logistics zone and Export Processing Zone.

Transport

Manado-Bitung Toll Road
On 16 January 2014 local authorities passed responsibility to acquire land for the Manado–Bitung Toll Road to the Public Works Ministry, although the initiation of works after the formality would take some time. The construction of the 39.9-km toll road is expected to cost Rp 6.7 trillion (US$ 503 million), and the Indonesian Government expects it to be completed by late 2018 and operational on 2019.

Davao-Bitung Roll-On Roll-Off Ferry Service

On 28 April 2017, Philippines President Rodrigo Duterte and Indonesia President Joko Widodo inaugurated the Davao-Bitung Roll-on Roll-Off Ferry Service that will allow journey time of just 3 days between two cities. The original shipping route from Davao City in Mindanao, Philippines took up to 5 weeks because ships first have to sail northwards to Manila, passing through South China Sea and Malaysia waters before it reaches various ports in Indonesia.  
Under the program, there are 5 to 10 companies who will use the initial voyage of the Cebu-based Asia Marine Transport Corp.’s M/V Super Shuttle RORO 12 with a 500-TEU capacity. Among the goods to be traded include animal feeds, aqua products, charcoal, coffee beans, construction materials, copra, feed ingredients, fertilizers, food and beverages, fresh fruits, ice cream products, meats, peanuts, poultry (halal), soya, sugar, and synthetics. By 2019, however, the route had ceased operations due to a lack of demand caused by similarities in commodities produced by the two cities.

Climate
Bitung has a tropical rainforest climate (Af) with heavy to very heavy rainfall year-round.

References

Media 
https://web.archive.org/web/20130808160445/http://bitungtimes.com/

 
Port cities and towns in Indonesia